China Movie Channel Media Awards (电影频道传媒大奖) are presented at each Shanghai International Film Festival by China Movie Channel. Voted by the reporters in the entertainment industry, the awards are aimed at "promoting medium-and-small-budget homegrown movies and exposing talented young directors and actors".

The individual categories were "Most Attractive Director"(最受关注导演), "Most Attractive Actor"(最受关注男演员) and  "Most Attractive Actress"(最受关注女演员) during 2007–2010. Since 2011, the categories alter to "Best Director"(最佳导演), "Best Actor"(最佳男主角) and "Best Actress"(最佳女主角). In 2016, they changed the individual categories back to pre-2011 again.

Award categories and winners

References

Chinese film awards
Shanghai International Film Festival